Sphinx and the Cursed Mummy is an action-adventure video game inspired by the mythology of Ancient Egypt for GameCube, PlayStation 2 and Xbox. The game was developed by Eurocom and published by THQ. Nordic Games acquired THQ in 2014 and formed THQ Nordic, as a result, a remastered version of the game was released worldwide for Microsoft Windows, macOS and Linux on November 10, 2017. A physical Nintendo Switch version with several enhancements was released on January 29, 2019.

In Sphinx and the Cursed Mummy, the player falls into the role of a demigod, Sphinx, and the undead corpse of Tutankhamen. Sphinx's role is one of a brave warrior who battles fearsome monsters and relies on raw power to complete tasks. Tutenkhanmen, also known as the Mummy, revolves around puzzle-solving and logical thinking to outwit his foes.

Plot
The fictional version of Egypt in which the game is set is in a period of turmoil when the player is introduced to Sphinx, one of the main protagonists. He and his fellow apprentice Horus are given the task of retrieving the legendary Blade of Osiris by their master, Imhotep. They are taken to Uruk, "the land of darkness", where they eventually find the Blade. Horus is attacked and supposedly killed by a deadly ray that protects the Castle of Uruk. Sphinx retrieves the Blade, but while trying to escape is also attacked by the ray and forced to travel to an unknown location through the use of a portal system.

Meanwhile, the young Prince Tutenkhamen of Luxor celebrates his birthday, but his older brother, Akhenaten, captures him and performs a ritual that turns him into a mummy. Sphinx arrives and interrupts the ritual, causing Tutenkhamen, Akhenaten and his henchman Menes to be teleported to the Castle of Uruk. Sphinx learns that fragments of Tutenkhamen's soul are stored in Canopic Vases, and takes on the task of recollecting them to restore him to his former self. In the Castle, Akhenaten gloats that the recent events were nothing but a minor setback. The player then learns that "Akhenaten" is in fact the dark god Set in disguise, and that the real Akhenaten was mummified in the same way as Tutenkhamen to allow Set to assume his form. However, because of Sphinx's actions he cannot disguise himself as Tutenkhamen to take power in Luxor as planned.

Sphinx and Imhotep devise a plan to use the Mummy/Tutenkhamen's immortality to their benefit; a single Canopic Vase is able to bring him to life for a short while, but he still remains practically dead allowing him to safely venture the trap-riddled Castle of Uruk. Imhotep creates Bas-ket, who can sneak inside the castle to deliver the Vases to the Mummy. Throughout the story, the Mummy exploits his inability to be killed to survive the traps and retrieve valuable items to aid Sphinx in his quest. In return, Sphinx finds more Canopic Vases over the course of the game and uses Bas-ket to send them to his undead ally.

During his time in the city of Heliopolis, Sphinx learns that the god Anubis has caused great suffering to the people of the land; most prominently, he cast many of them into stone statues. Sphinx's heroic nature appeals to Anubis, and gradually allows him to free the people from their stone curse. However, the tasks given to Sphinx become more dangerous over time. Anubis asks him to retrieve "Sacred Crowns", immensely powerful objects once used by the gods of Egypt.

The first crown to retrieve is the Sacred Crown of Abydos, a city barraged by various disasters and troubles (though not apparent at first, the chaos is the work of Set). Most recently, the Mayor falls very ill and the Crown almost falls into the hands of his traitorous aides. Sphinx is able to save him and in return is rewarded with the crown.

Each crown presents a greater challenge for Sphinx than the previous; he battles and defeats the fearsome Geb Queen for possession of the Sacred Crown of Uruk, and the pharaoh of Heliopolis for the Crown of Heliopolis. As Sphinx proves his might to Anubis, the enigmatic god reveals he cast the people of Heliopolis into stone to protect them from the darkness that will soon descend upon Egypt at the hands of Set.

The Mummy discovers The Sacred Crown of Set, the final crown, in the depths of The Castle of Uruk. He takes it and this greatly weakens the ray protecting the castle. Bas-ket is able to escape with the crown, but Set catches the Mummy and paralyses him.

With all four Sacred Crowns, Anubis is able to summon Osiris, another god who reveals he and Set were once a single form named Ra. Set, however, became greedy and stole power from Osiris to take over Egypt. Osiris uses the last of his power to transport Sphinx past the defenses of The Castle of Uruk, where he challenges Set for the fate of all Egypt. Set takes on his "true form"; a hideous monster with immense power, but Sphinx is able to defeat him. Set is not destroyed, indeed Imhotep appears and tells Sphinx that this is not in his destiny. Instead, Osiris arrives and forcibly reunites himself with the weakened Set and Ra is formed once again. Ra gives the Mummy the last Canopic Vase, but the Mummy tragically falls and breaks it. As the game ends on a cliffhanger, Imhotep states there may be other ways to help Tutenkhamen regain his human form.

Development
The game was first announced by THQ on February 19, 2003, under the working title Sphinx. Touted as a GameCube and PlayStation 2 title, it would ultimately launch on the Xbox, as well. Eurocom developed the game over a period of roughly three years, including time spent creating the title's original engine. The design for Sphinx himself changed greatly over time, from a young child of about six to his final form as a teenager. In creating the two differing styles of gameplay, the developers took inspiration from exploration and puzzle-solving in past games, such as the Zelda series. During development, the role of the cursed mummy, Tutankhamen, increased in prominence. Early Sphinx featured a 70/30 split of play time between Sphinx and Tutankhamen, which was adjusted in the latter's favor in response to positive reactions to the character. In line with this shift, the game's title was changed from the earlier Sphinx and the Shadow of Set to the advertised Sphinx and the Misfortunate Mummy sometime during mid-August and early September, shortly before release. The Shadow of Set development title had still been in use when THQ began providing demo discs for the PlayStation 2 version online. It would ultimately be released in November with the finalized title of Sphinx and the Cursed Mummy.

It was originally intended that Sphinx transform into a mythical sphinx—a winged lion with human features. Flying sequences were to comprise around 30% of Sphinx (the character)'s gameplay. These sections were triggered by reaching specific points in the game, one such area involving "flying through [...] tubes trying to get to a fortress, with many different obstacles on the way". A pre-production concept animation showcased the sphinx idea, and character designer Juan Solís produced models for the character's sphinx form, which ultimately went unused. Early media about the game also indicated that several further regions of Egypt would be included. IGN described the game's "seven worlds", including "the jungles, swamps and lakes of Sakkara" and "the underwater city of Akaria," neither of which featured in the final game. In pre-release interviews, THQ's Rob Loftus stated that Eurocom would be taking "full advantage" of the GameCube hardware, which would be evident in that version's improved lighting features.

Steve Duckworth, audio manager at Eurocom, composed the game's soundtrack, which was later published online for free download.

Mobile version
The mobile version is a completely different 2D game. THQ Wireless published a Java version for mobile phones, developed by Humagade. As in the console game, players alternately control Sphinx and Tutankhamen (the mummy) in action and puzzle-solving scenarios, respectively. Players seek out Tutankhamen's preserved organs in order to restore him to life while tracking the evil Set through the city of Uruk.

PC version
A PC port was developed by Swyter, the author of an HD texture pack for the GameCube version. Swyter is constantly updating the game for better performance and adding options to it. The development kit, EuroLand, was released on February 19, 2018, allowing for mods of the game. The Akaria and Sakkara beta levels, removed in the final game, were recreated with EuroLand as mods that are now available in the Steam Workshop.

Technical issues
Using one of the save points in the Mummy section immediately following a particular cutscene that would reveal Horus' Betrayal in the story can cause a door to be permanently sealed if the play session is not immediately continued in all three console versions of the game. This traps the player, preventing further progress with no way to reverse the action. This forces the player to start over from the very beginning of the game. This bug was fixed in the PC and Switch version of the game, including the version hosted on the digital video game distribution platform Steam.

Reception

Sphinx was well received by much of the gaming community. IGN gave the game 8.5/10, calling it a "fun, challenging action-adventure serv[ing] up a semi-non-linear experience complete with huge worlds to explore, difficult and satisfying puzzles, entertaining weapon and item advancements". It was praised by critics for its unique characters and compelling storyline. The game's graphics were also highly praised for their quality. However, some criticism was directed at the lack of voice acting to coincide with the text-heavy dialogue. Commercially, the game performed poorly, with "sluggish sales [...] across all systems".

The mobile release received a more muted response, though still generally positive, with a 70.50% aggregate score on GameRankings. IGN's Levi Buchanan admired the game's graphics, but criticised the "freaky" isometric controls for not being "as user-friendly as they need to be", overall feeling the game was "a pretty good purchase for fans of the original console game or in the hunt for an adventure title." Reviewing the title for GameSpot, Carrie Gouskos enjoyed the game's adherence to the style of the console title, saying it did "a good job of maintaining the look and personality of the franchise", but called the controls "uncomfortable", the sound "not that interesting" and said the gameplay "doesn't have great longevity", overall finding it frustrating for anyone but players seeking "a simple little action game [or] particular fan[s] of the series".

References

External links
Official website

2003 video games
Action-adventure games
GameCube games
Eurocom games
Java platform games
Linux games
MacOS games
Mobile games
Nintendo Switch games
PlayStation 2 games
Single-player video games
THQ games
THQ Nordic games
Video games based on Egyptian mythology
Video games developed in the United Kingdom
Video games scored by Steve Duckworth
Video games set in castles
Video games set in Egypt
Windows games
Xbox games
Humagade games